Ibrahima Aminata Condé (born 5 February 1998) is a Guinean international footballer who plays for Horoya AC, as a defender.

Career
He has played club football for AS Ashanti Golden Boys and Horoya AC.

He made his international debut for Guinea in 2016.

References

1998 births
Living people
Guinean footballers
Guinea international footballers
AS Ashanti Golden Boys players
Horoya AC players
Association football defenders
Guinea A' international footballers
2016 African Nations Championship players
2020 African Nations Championship players